Soorya  is an Indian actress who appeared in Malayalam and Tamil films. She was a prominent actress in 1980s. She was well noted for her glamorous roles. She debuted with the film Parankimala in 1981.

Filmography

Malayalam

Parankimala (1981) as Thankam
Odukkam Thudakkam (1982)
Rathilayam (1983) as Sarasamma
Adaminte Vaariyellu (1984) as Ammini
Sandhyaykkenthinu Sindooram (1984)
Poochakkoru Mookkuthi (1984) as Revathy's friend
Vanitha Police (1984) as Kausalya
Samantharam (1985) as Susan
Sammelanam (1985) as Radha
Paara (1985)
Janakeeya Kodathi (1985) as Santha
Uyarum Njaan Naadaake (1985) as Jagamma
Arappatta Kettiya Gramathil (1986)
Oru Yuga Sandhya (1986) as Ammu
Meenamaasathile Sooryan (1986)
Ilanjippookkal (1986)
Oridathu (1986) as Malu
Niramulla Ravukal (1986) as Saradha
Dheem Tharikida Thom (1986)
Kadhaykku Pinnil (1987) as Geetha
Ithrayum Kaalam (1987) as Ambujam
Ee Noottandile Mahaarogam (1987)
Agnimuhoortham (1987)
 Kayyethum  Doorath (1987) 
 Kurukkan Rajavayi (1988)
Inquilabinte Puthri (1988)Ore Thooval Pakshikal (1988)Chithram (1988) as Mooppan's daughterMarikkunnilla Njaan (1988)Samvalsarangal (1988)Oru Vadakkan Veeragatha (1989) as Blacksmith's daughterAattinakkare (1989) as KomalamRugmini (1989) as SaraswathiMinda Poochakku Kalyanam (1990) as ChandramathiEe Thanutha Veluppan Kalathu (1990) as Ponnan's wifeVishnulokam (1991)Mahayanam (1991)Abhayam (1991)Bali (1995)Made In Usa (2005)

TamilKokkarakko (1983)Ponnu Pudichirukku (1984)Kannukku Mai Ezhuthu (1986)Piranthaen Valarnthaen (1986)Kavithai Paada Neramillai (1987)Manamagale Vaa (1988)Kadhal Enum Nadhiyinile (1989)Adhisaya Manithan (1990)Nila Pennae (1990) as IsaikkiThyagu (1990)Oru Veedu Iru Vasal (1990) as ShenbegamKavalukku Kettikaran (1990) as Arivukodi's motherNee Pathi Naan Pathi (1991)Sir I Love You (1991)Chinna Thayee (1992) as Samundi's wifeYermunai (1992)Konjum Kili (1993)Karpagam Vanthachu'' (1993) as Sarasu

References

 http://cinidiary.com/peopleinfo.php?pigsection=Actor&picata=2&no_of_displayed_rows=9&no_of_rows_page=10&sletter=S
 http://www.malayalachalachithram.com/profiles.php?i=7013
 http://www.mallumovies.org/artist/surya

External links

 Soorya at MSI

Actresses in Malayalam cinema
Actresses from Tamil Nadu
Indian film actresses
Actresses in Tamil cinema
Living people
Year of birth missing (living people)
Place of birth missing (living people)
20th-century Indian actresses
21st-century Indian actresses
Actresses in Malayalam television